Ir. Shaharuddin bin Ismail is a Malaysian politician. He was the Member of the Parliament of Malaysia for the Kangar constituency in Perlis from May 2013 to May 2018. He was elected in the 2013 election, after picked to replace Mohd Radzi Sheikh Ahmad as UMNO's candidate for Kangar seat. Presently he is a member of Parti Amanah Negara (AMANAH), a component of Pakatan Harapan (PH) coalition, after his resignation from United Malays National Organisation (UMNO) of Barisan Nasional (BN) in 2018.

Election results

See also
Kangar (federal constituency)

References

Living people
Malaysian people of Malay descent
Malaysian Muslims
Malaysian engineers
National Trust Party (Malaysia) politicians
Former United Malays National Organisation politicians
Members of the Dewan Rakyat
1967 births